The Fool: Scenes of Bread and Love is a play by the English playwright Edward Bond. It traces the life of the poet John Clare against the backdrop of the Industrial Revolution, from his roots in rural East Anglia via literary success in London to his final years in a lunatic asylum. The play was first performed at the Royal Court Theatre in 1975, in a production directed by Peter Gill and featuring a cast including Tom Courtenay, David Troughton and Nigel Terry among others.

After a 35-year hiatus, The Fool was revived in the UK in late 2010 as part of the six-play Edward Bond Season at the Cock Tavern Theatre in Kilburn, London. Bond himself directed the production, with Ben Crispin playing the role of John Clare. It is one of the highly regarded works in Bond's output.

Original cast

John Clare - Tom Courtenay
Miles - David Troughton
Darkie - Nigel Terry
Lawrence - Mick Ford
Patty - Bridget Turner
Mary - Caroline Hutchison
Lord Milton - Nicholas Selby
The Parson - John Normington
Lord Milton's Guests - Peter Myers,John Boswall,Malcolm Ingram,Robert Lloyd,Shiela Kelley,Avril Marsh
Wadlow, Lord Milton's Gamekeeper - Roger Hume
Hilary, the Assistant Keeper - David Ellison
Bob - Roderick Smith
Peter - Malcolm Ingram
Betty - Shiela Kelley
Hamo - Brian Hall
Gentlemen - Peter Myers, Robert Lloyd, John Boswall
Hicks, a Warder - Tony Rohr
Governor - Peter Myers
Porter - Ken Gajadhar
Jackson - Brian Hall
Porter's Backers - Malcolm Ingram, Mick Ford
Jackson's Backers - David Troughton, Roger Hume
Referee - David Ellison
A Boy - Roderick Smith
Mrs. Emmerson - Isabel Dean
Charles Lamb - Robert Lloyd
Mary Lamb - Gillian Martell
Admiral Lord Radstock - Bill Fraser
Dr. Skrimshtrb - John Boswall
Tommy - Tony Rohr
Michael - Roger Hume
Arny - Brian Hall
Napoleon - John Normington
A Man in a Straitjacket - Mick Ford
An Attendant - David Troughton

Reception
The Spectator's Kenneth Hurren criticized the play and the performance after the Royal Court Theatre premiere, arguing that the work consists of two different plays that "do not so much blend with as disappear into each other" and saying that Courtenay "has a hard time with Clare".

In a 2001 article for The New York Times, Benedict Nightingale described The Fool as "moving". In 2006, Mark Ravenhill praised the boxing match as one of Bond's "brilliant images". Elizabeth Davis of Kilburn Times wrote, after seeing the 2010 performance directed by Bond, that "the play has powerful moments but the production was overly long (at 2hr 45mins) and, at times, as po-faced as the pompous vicar. Nevertheless, Bond, as ever, creates a memorable and thought-provoking evening." In the same year, Ravenhill lauded the play as a "brilliant [...] landmark" work and wrote, "There is no play that more acutely captures the experience of being a writer who is happily snatched up by London literary circles and then just as hastily dispatched".

Michael Billington of The Guardian called The Fool "a fine play" in a 2010 review of a different play. Lyn Gardner described it as "a very fine play about Clare" in the same paper. Playwright Nicholas Wright referred to it as a "great play". Pamela McCallum wrote in 2016 that the play "represents a high point of post-war British drama and perhaps can be taken as a site of division between generations in theatre. The following generation—Churchill, Ravenhill, Kane, and Butterworth—foreground, in very different ways, the psychological distortions and devastating brutalities of the contemporary world".

Awards
The Fool won Best Play of 1976 in the Plays and Players London Critics Award.

References

External links
 BBC News on the Edward Bond Season 2010 
 Details of original production in 1975 

1975 plays
Plays by Edward Bond
Plays based on real people